DOXA Magazine is a Russian online student magazine.

History  
The magazine was founded in 2017 by students at the Higher School of Economics in Moscow and named after the Ancient Greek term Doxa. Initially only focusing on university affairs, the magazine soon began covering student human rights activism, including struggles against sexual harassment and academic censorship, and in opposition to the Putin regime, where many students often played significant roles.

After mass arrests in the 2019 Moscow protests, including two DOXA journalists, the magazine launched a project called Here We Stand, offering digital resources against police brutality. In December 2019, the Higher School of Economics university board cut its funding of the magazine, alleging that the magazine was harming the university's reputation and harboured a political agenda.

In May 2020, the magazine ran a series of articles on sexual harassment at Moscow State University.

In January 2021, Roskomnadzor forced the magazine to delete a video covering the 2021 Russian protests. The video had discussed pressures students faced ahead of the protests and the threats of expulsions students faced for participating in the protests. The magazine then filed a lawsuit against Roskomnadzor contesting the order to delete the video.

In April 2021, Russian police raided the magazine's office as well as the apartments of several of the editors' families. Four of the magazine's editors, Armen Aramyan, Natalya Tyshkevich, Vladimir Metyolkin and Alla Gutnikova, were then charged by the Investigative Committee of Russia with encouraging minors to take part in illegal activity. Human rights groups raised concerns about the arrests, claiming that they were made in an attempt to suppress freedom of the press in Russia. Amnesty International stated that "the Russian authorities’ intention is transparent. Investigations into corruption will not be tolerated, mobilizing youth to actively and peacefully participate in society will be prosecuted, and those journalists and media outlets who receive foreign funding will be ostracized and labelled as foreign agents." Later that month, the Moscow City Court upheld the decision to impose pretrial restrictions on the editors, confining them to house arrest but allowing the editors to spend up to two hours outside per day. In April 2022, after spending a year under house arrest, the four editors were sentenced to two years of correctional labour.

Following the 2022 Russian invasion of Ukraine, the magazine published a guide for Russian youth on how to talk to their older relatives and co-workers about the invasion, including a list of rebuttals to common pro-war talking points. Roskomnadzor demanded that the magazine delete the guide.

In 2023, the magazine was awarded the Student Peace Prize for their work exposing corruption and sexual harassment at universities, documenting state persecution, and fighting government disinformation.

Political position 
The magazine's editors have described the magazine as pro-feminist but not specifically left-wing, stating that:We write about the problems Russian students have, and it turns out that regardless of our views (many in the editorial office do have leftist views) the language for these problems also happens to be left wing. When you write about discrimination against women, the sexual harassment of female students and female university employees, about work-related issues among teachers – their lack of job security, and increasing precarity – you notice that the criticism of these phenomena is steeped in a left, anti-capitalist and anti-patriarchal language. The upshot is that we also speak in this language, otherwise there is no way we can articulate the problems faced by teachers and students in Russian universities.

The magazine has also spoken out against the commercialisation of post-secondary education in Russia.

References

External links 
  of DOXA Magazine

Student newspapers
Student magazines
Magazines published in Russia
Freedom of the press
Publications established in 2017
Russian news websites
Russian-language magazines